Thomas Stellmach (born 1965 in Straubing, West Germany) is a German animated film producer and director. Stellmach has received many awards including the Academy Award for Best Animated Short Film for his 1996 film Quest. 

Stellmach studied at the Department of Animation at the University of Kassel Art College in Germany, being taught by the well-known artist Paul Driessen. Having received his Degree of Arts in 1999 Stellmach founded the animation studio Lichthof, Film & Animation in Kassel with two partners and produced animation films for television and advertising. He has handed off his share of the company to focus on artistic animation projects since 2009. His field of experience contains computer animation, stop motion, animated cartoon and pixilation. Stellmach directed the animated experimental film Virtuos Virtuell with the artist Maja Oschmann to the overture of Louis Spohr's opera The Alchymist in stereoscopic.

So far he hold workshops at various academies, e.g.

 2002 - now: annual animation workshop with the prize winners of the International Competition for Youths, youth creativ’ by the association of the German Volks- u. Raiffeisenbanken, Germany
 2012: stop motion workshop at the Youth Training Institute, Hanau
 2011: stop motion workshop at the Royal Film Commission, Amman, Jordan
 2007 - 2011: annual stop motion workshop at the University of Television and Film Munich
 2003: animation workshop at the University of Kassel Art College
 1997, 2000 - 2001: animation lectures at the Film Academy Baden-Wuerttemberg
 1997, 2001 and 2008: animation lectures at the Academy of Media Arts Cologne
 1996: several animation lectures at the Karlsruhe University of Arts and Design

His film, Quest, was included in the Animation Show of Shows.

Filmography 

 2013: Virtuos Virtuell, animated experimental film (directors: Thomas Stellmach, Maja Oschmann)
 2001-2008: Commercials, computer animation / cartoon animation / stop motion animation, Client: Wrigley's HubbaBubba / BBDO-Düsseldorf, German Pay-TV Premiere / Goldammer, Landesbausparkasse / BBDO-Berlin, Lindt & Sprüngli / FCB Wilkens, MTV-Germany, ZDF-German Television / Kika (Direction, Animation, Production: Lichthof - Film & Animation)

Short films and commercials during study
Direction, Animation, Production: Thomas Stellmach (As far as nothing else is mentioned.)

 2000:  Chicken Kiev, cartoon animation, 9 min
 1998:  Lebenshilfe-Commercial, cartoon animation, 0:30 min, (Idea, Director, Animation: Monika Stellmach), Client: Lebenshilfe e.V.
 1996:  Quest, puppet animation, 11 min, (Director: Tyron Montgomery)
 1995: 100 Years of Cinema, cartoon animation, 3 min, (Idea, Director, Animation, Production: Students of the Art College Kassel), Client: HR-Television
 1994:  Old Super Lady, cartoon animation, 0:30 min, Client: MTV-Europe
 1994:  Small Talk, pixilation, 5 min, (Animation: Students of the Art College Kassel)
 1994:  Filmladen-Trailer, pixilation, 2 min, (Animation: Students of the Art College Kassel), Client: Filmladen Kassel
 1992:  Weeds, cartoon animation, 5 min
 1988:  Gulp, experimental / life action, 5 min, (Idea, Director, Animation, Production: Mark Feuerstake; Actor: Thomas Stellmach)
 1988:  Tee-Hee, cartoon animation, 2 min

Short films before study
 1987:  White, puppet animation, 11 min
 1986:  Let me live, clay animation,  6 min
 1986:  Rom and Jul, object animation, 14 min
 1985:  The last Leaf, clay animation, 6 min
 1985:  The big Labyrinth, clay animation, 5 min
 1985:  Competition without Winners, object animation, 12  min
 1984:  Clay, clay animation, 5 min
 1982:  Domino Play, 5 min, object animation

External links 

1965 births
Living people
Directors of Best Animated Short Academy Award winners
English-language film directors
German animated film directors
German animated film producers
Film people from Bavaria
People from Straubing
University of Kassel alumni